Nalanda Boys' National College - Minuwangoda - Minuwangoda  was the fourth central college in Sri Lanka, according to a concept of C. W. W. Kannangara. Nalanda College - Minuwangoda is a government Buddhist school in Sri Lanka, and was founded in 1939.

History
During Second World War in 1939 one part of Nalanda College, Colombo was taken to Minuwangoda and other part to Maharagama. After the end of the war it returned to its original site and Minuwangoda Nalanda Maha Vidyalaya was established here with the guidance of Venerable Heenatiyana Dhammaloka Thero.

Alumni
The Minuwangoda Nalanda Central College Old Boys Association is the alumni association of the school.

School houses
Students are divided into four houses, whose names are derived from Sinhala language.

Cadet contingent

The cadet band was formed in 1992. It trains school cadets under the 7 Battalion of National Cadet Corps. It was formed under the guidance of the principal, V. V. Munasinghe, Major Ratnamalala and Captain Sandaruwan, who was the CO and Adjutant of 7NCC respectively at that time. The cadet contingent has won the Herman Loose Trophy on a number of occasions.

References

Boys' schools in Sri Lanka
National schools in Sri Lanka
Buddhist schools in Sri Lanka
Schools in Gampaha
Educational institutions established in 1912
1912 establishments in Ceylon